Countess Antonina Dmitrievna Bludova (Антонина Дмитриевна Блудова; 25 April 1813 – 9 April 1891) was a Russian philanthropist, salonist, memoirist and lady-in-waiting.

Antonina Bludova was the eldest child of Count Dmitry Bludov, one of Nicholas I's trusted ministers and advisors. She was born in Stockholm, where her father was on the Russian embassy staff. From an early age, she met Alexander Pushkin, Vasily Zhukovsky, Nikolai Gogol, Mikhail Lermontov, Aleksey Khomyakov and other successful authors. Her salon was one of the most fashionable in Saint Petersburg, serving as a vital link between the imperial court and the Slavophile (or Pan-Slavist) circles. She was made a senior lady-in-waiting in 1863.

After her father's death in 1864, this influential spinster decided to leave the capital in order to devote herself to Christian causes. She founded an Orthodox bratstvo in Ostrog which included an elementary school, a school for girls, a public library, a hospital, a drug store and a home for pilgrims travelling to the Pochayev Monastery. She died in Moscow at the age of 77 and was buried in the Novodevichy Convent. Her memoirs were published in 1889.

Sources 

1813 births
1891 deaths
Writers from Stockholm
Ladies-in-waiting from the Russian Empire
Writers from the Russian Empire
Memoirists from the Russian Empire
Salon holders from the Russian Empire
Philanthropists from the Russian Empire
Slavophiles
Women memoirists
Women writers from the Russian Empire
19th-century philanthropists
19th-century memoirists
Expatriates from the Russian Empire in Sweden